Leigh Raymond Matthews (born 1 March 1952) is a former Australian rules footballer and coach.

Squat, short-legged and barrel-chested, Matthews earned the iconic nickname "Lethal Leigh" due to his physical as well as skillful style of play. He is officially recognised as the "best player of the 20th century" according to the AFL, is a Legend in the Australian Football Hall of Fame, on the Hawthorn and AFL Teams of the Centuries and is one of the most successful AFL coaches of all time. He is now an AFL commentator on television with the Seven Network and on radio with 3AW.

Playing career

Hawthorn Football Club
Matthews played his junior football at the Chelsea Football Club. He joined Hawthorn in January 1969, aged sixteen and having already played senior suburban football.

Part of a footballing family, Matthews' brother Kelvin played 155 games at Hawthorn and Geelong. Matthews made his senior debut for the Hawks in round 16 of the 1969 season against Melbourne as a forward pocket, crumbing around the feet of Hawthorn's champion full forward, Peter Hudson. Matthews kicked a goal with his first kick and went on to kick at least one goal in each of his five games that year, winning the club's Best First Year Player award. By midway through 1970, Matthews had earned a regular place in the team as a rover rotating forward. He was immediately impressive, kicking 20 goals from 16 games for the season.

1970s
Though still a teenager, Matthews became one of the most important players in a dominant Hawthorn team in 1971. He developed an uncanny ability to win contests, especially near the goals. He kicked 43 goals at an average of 1.9 in 1971 and earned his first of fourteen Victorian guernseys, his first of eight Hawthorn Best and Fairest awards, and his first of four playing premiership medallions.

On 17 July 1971, Matthews notoriously felled one of the game's fairest and best rovers, Barry Cable, with an elbow to the head. This was the first in a series of occasional violent lapses that punctuated, and ultimately soiled, Matthews' stellar career, culminating in his conviction for criminal assault arising out of an on-field incident in 1985 described below.

In round two of 1972, Matthews destroyed North Melbourne, for the first of what would end up being many times. He kicked 8 goals in the absence of Hudson (who suffered a season ending knee injury the previous week). Matthews kicked another six goals against South Melbourne in round 18 and finished the season with 45 goals at 2.1 per game. He won his second club best and fairest—before his 21st birthday. Matthews made his presence felt early again in 1973 with an amazing 11-goal haul against Essendon in round 3, also amassing 42 possessions in the same game. The rest of his season was comparatively quiet; however, his total of 51 goals from 19 games was an impressive figure given the increased time he spent in the midfield. By 1974, Matthews had become one of the toughest and most damaging players in the game. Strong, quick and almost impossible to tackle, Matthews regularly turned matches with brilliant solo efforts. Against Collingwood in a semi final Matthews proved the difference with 7 goals from 24 disposals. He went on to win his third best and fairest, averaging 21.8 disposals and kicking 52 goals for the season.

After six seasons in the VFL, Matthews established himself as a superstar of the competition in 1975, winning the Coleman Medal as the League's leading goal kicker, with 67 goals (68 including finals), while averaging 22.9 disposals per game. While 67 goals was an unusually low tally, it was a rare result for a non-full forward to lead the competition. He started the season brilliantly with 47 goals in the first 12 games, including five bags of 5 or more. His 6 goals from 28 kicks in round 9 against Footscray was a highlight. He was unable to maintain this pace in the second half of the season and could manage only 21 goals in his last 11 appearances. Hawthorn made the Grand Final; however, they fell to North Melbourne, with Matthews going goalless on the day.

Another brilliant season in 1976 confirmed Matthews as one of the best players in the game. He kicked more goals than most Full Forwards, while also being one of the most effective ball winners in the game. For the season Matthews kicked 71 goals at 3.2 per game and averaged 22.5 disposals, winning his fourth Best and Fairest. His best game for the year came in a Qualifying Final against North Melbourne, when he had 31 kicks and kicked 7 goals from 13 scoring shots. It was an immense performance in a hard-fought win. Hawthorn again played North in the Grand Final, and although Matthews was not amongst the best this time, his second premiership medal was just reward for a brilliant season.

In the 1977 season Matthews went from being from one of the best players in league to one of the best of all time, with what was among the greatest individual seasons by any player in history. Matthews posted career highs in kicks, marks, handballs and goals, averaging 27.1 disposals per game and kicking 91 goals at 3.8 per game. He had 41 disposals in round 10 against Melbourne, but the peak of Matthews' form came during the last eight games of the home and away season, during which he averaged 29.8 disposals and 5.1 goals. He kicked 7 goals and had 30-plus disposals three times in seven weeks and finished the season with another 30 disposals and 6 goals against Essendon in round 22. He won Hawthorn's best and fairest for the fifth time. Matthews 91 goals that year was a record for goals kicked by a non-full forward, until it was broken in 1990 by Collingwood's Peter Daicos (where Matthews was then coaching).

Matthews' performances in 1978 further confirmed his status as the game's number one player, as he added another 71 goals to his career tally and averaged 25.5 disposals and a career-high 6.4 marks, in a year that saw him win his sixth Best and Fairest and his third premiership medallion. The Hawks again played North Melbourne in the grand final, but this time a best afield display of 28 disposals and 4 goals by Matthews ensured the win for Hawthorn.

Matthews was on track for another stellar season in 1979 before injury forced him out of all but two of the last 10 games of the year. A 7-goal performance against Richmond in round 5 was a highlight in a season that saw him spend less time in front of goals and more in the midfield.

1980s
In 1980, Matthews became the captain of Hawthorn, a position he held until his retirement in 1985. He was also selected as the captain of the Victorian State of Origin team for the only time in his career, and he won his seventh club Best and Fairest. Matthews spent less time in the forward line and while it was the first time since 1971 that he averaged fewer than two goals per game, his 26.9 disposals per game was second highest in the league.

Hawthorn opened the 1981 season against Melbourne in round 1 and Matthews, under a slight injury cloud, lined up at full forward to great effect. He took 10 marks and kicked 11 goals. Matthews missed five games between rounds 3 and 8, before returning to his customary role, alternating between the forward line and midfield, for the rest of the season. He maintained impressive form for most of the year, averaging 23.5 disposals and 3.0 goals in his 16 games. Matthews finished the season as Hawthorn's leading goal kicker for the first four consecutive years.

After three seasons interrupted by injury and inconsistent form, Matthews returned to his best in 1982, winning the inaugural Players' Association Most Valuable Player award (which was later renamed, in Matthews' honour, to the Leigh Matthews Trophy). He kicked 7 goals in round 16 against North Melbourne and two weeks later against Collingwood kicked 8 more and had 25 disposals. Matthews averaged 22.5 disposals and 3.4 goals per game for the year and won his eighth Hawthorn Best and Fairest award.

Matthews earned the nickname "Lethal" for his reputation for giving (and taking) very hard bumps, and in 1982 this reputation was enhanced to the point of legend when he famously collided with a behind post at Windy Hill and broke it. A piece of the post (measuring about one metre) broke off, hitting the boundary umpire, after Matthews ran into its base. It is believed that, to comply with a VFL directive, groundsmen at Windy Hill had glued an extension to the top of the post which broke loose after Matthews collided with it. At the time, commentator Lou Richards called him a "He-Man" due to his large size and strength.

Going into his fifteenth season in the VFL, Matthews showed no signs of slowing down in 1983. He averaged 22.3 disposals and 2.9 goals in his first twelve games before, in round 15, he made the move to full forward and remained there for the rest of the season. He went on to kick at least three goals in each of the last 10 games of the year, including the Grand Final, in which he kicked 6 goals and 5 behinds in his fourth premiership win. For the season he averaged 20.1 disposals and 3.6 goals per game.

Retirement
The 1985 season was Matthews' last as a player. During a wild game vs Geelong which was marred by numerous brawls and reports, Matthews struck Geelong player Neville Bruns in an off-the-ball incident, breaking his opponent's jaw. Geelong's Steve Hocking exacted swift retribution, breaking Matthews' nose and an all-in melee ensued. No report was laid by umpires against Matthews. However, the 'behind play' incident had been captured on camera. After much public outcry, the VFL launched an investigation and subsequently deregistered Matthews for four weeks. He was also charged with assault and fined $1,000. His conviction was later overturned on appeal. The charge remains the only time a top-level player has been charged for an on-field incident.

Matthews 332nd and final game was the 1985 Grand Final loss to Essendon.

Upon retirement, Matthews had scored 915 goals, which remains the highest tally by a non-full forward. At the time of his retirement, it was the fourth-highest tally by any player; he is now 9th all time. Matthews also accrued 202 Brownlow Medal votes in his career, currently the sixth most of all time. His tally was the most by a player who has not won the award.

Coaching career

Collingwood
Following his retirement, Matthews turned to coaching, becoming assistant coach at the Collingwood Football Club before taking over the head coaching role as senior coach from Bob Rose after 3 rounds in 1986. Matthews guided Collingwood to finish sixth at the end of the 1986 season, just missing out of the finals with twelve wins and ten losses. In the 1987 season, Collingwood under Matthews did not fare much better where they finished twelve at the end of the season with seven wins and fifteen losses. In the 1988 season, Matthews guided Collingwood to finish second on the ladder, but were eliminated by Melbourne in the semi final. In the 1989 season, Matthews guided Collingwood to finish fifth on the ladder, but were once again eliminated by Melbourne in the elimination final. Under Matthews guidance, Collingwood won one premiership in 1990, Matthews' fifth premiership medallion, and for which he would later be retrospectively awarded one of his four Jock McHale Medals. In the 1990 Grand Final, Collingwood beat Essendon, ending the 32-year premiership drought generally referred to as "the Colliwobbles". In the 1991 season, Collingwood under Matthews just missed out of the finals, where they finished seventh on the ladder. In the 1992 season, Matthews guided Collingwood to finish third on the ladder, but they were eliminated by St Kilda in the elimination final. In the 1993 season, Collingwood under Matthews just missed out of the finals, where they finished eighth on the ladder. In the 1994 season, Collingwood under Matthews returned to the finals after they finished eighth on the ladder, but were eliminated by the eventual premiers West Coast Eagles in the qualifying final.  Matthews was sacked as Collingwood Football Club senior coach at the end of the 1995 season, following an unsuccessful season, where Collingwood under Matthews finished tenth on the ladder, therefore missing out of the finals. Matthews then made a statement after he was sacked as Collingwood Football Club senior coach stating “I can see where they’re coming from, so there’s animosity. Sometimes you just need a change and sometimes the easiest position to change is the coaching position”. Matthews was then replaced by Tony Shaw as Collingwood Football Club senior coach. Matthews coached a total of 224 games in ten seasons with 125 wins, 94 losses and 5 draws to a winning percentage of fifty-five percent with the Magpies.

Brisbane Lions
After three years, Matthews was coaxed out of retirement by the struggling Brisbane Lions, who had finished sixteenth, the last on the ladder for the 1998 wooden spoon. Matthews became the senior coach of Brisbane Lions for the 1999 season, when he replaced Brisbane Lions caretaker senior coach Roger Merrett, who replaced John Northey, after Northey was sacked in the middle of the 1998 season. Matthews' impact at the Lions was immediate, lifting the team from the bottom to third on the ladder in 1999, making the finals but were eliminated by the eventual premiers the Kangaroos in the preliminary final,  before making the finals again in 2000 before being eliminated by Carlton in the semi final by eighty-two points.

In 2001, Matthews famously used the Predator quote, "if it bleeds, we can kill it", to inspire his team for its round 10 game against Essendon, who sat atop the ladder, was the defending premier, and had lost only two of its previous thirty-four games. Brisbane finished as 28-point victors. Throughout the remainder of the season, the Lions were undefeated, eventually meeting and once again defeating Essendon in the 2001 Grand Final for their sixteenth consecutive win, and the first AFL premiership in club history. This would be the first of three consecutive premierships for the Lions under Matthews. Matthews then led Brisbane to consecutive triumph premiership victories over Collingwood in the 2002 Grand Final and the 2003 Grand Final. These wins gave Matthews a total of eight premiership medallions as a player or coach. His tenure crested at this point. A bid for a fourth consecutive premiership was brought undone by Port Adelaide in the 2004 Grand Final, when the Lions under Matthews lost by forty points. 

In the 2005 season, The Lions with Matthews finished eleventh on the ladder with ten wins and twelve losses, missing the finals for the first time under Matthews. Also during the 2005 season, after his mother died, Matthews took a leave of absence for one game, which was coached by assistant coach John Blakey, when he filled in as caretaker interim senior coach in the absence of regular senior coach Matthews, for the Round 18, 2005 game against the Western Bulldogs, which the Lions lost. In the 2006 season, The Lions under Matthews did not fare much better when their form further dropped when they finished thirteenth (third-last) on the ladder with seven wins and fifteen losses. In the 2007 season, The Lions under Matthews finished tenth on the ladder with nine wins, two draws and eleven losses. Also in 2007, he coached his 200th game with the club, making him the first person to play or coach 200 games with three clubs. In the 2008 season, the Lions under Matthews finished tenth on the ladder again for the second straight year in a row, this time with ten wins and twelve losses. 

Matthews resigned from his position as Brisbane Lions senior coach on 1 September 2008, at the end of the 2008 season, stating that he "felt the time was right". Matthews was then replaced by Michael Voss as Brisbane Lions senior coach.

Matthews coached Brisbane Lions to a total of 237 games with 142 wins, 92 losses and 3 draws with a winning percentage of 60 percent.

Matthews' coaching style at the Lions was reportedly incredibly strict, although obviously successful. Despite his four premierships as a coach, Matthews never coached a team to the minor premiership—though he did finish second with Collingwood twice and second with Brisbane three times.

Statistics

Playing statistics

|- style=background:#EAEAEA
| scope=row | 1969 ||  || 32
| 5 || 7 || 4 || 60 || 15 || 75 || 6 || 1.4 || 0.8 || 12.0 || 3.0 || 15.0 || 1.2 || 2
|-
| scope=row | 1970 ||  || 32
| 16 || 20 || 27 || 249 || 48 || 297 || 53 || 1.3 || 1.7 || 15.6 || 3.0 || 18.6 || 3.3 || 3
|- style=background:#EAEAEA
| scope=row bgcolor=F0E68C | 1971# ||  || 32
| 23 || 43 || 47 || 443 || 84 || 527 || 111 || 1.9 || 2.0 || 19.3 || 3.7 || 22.9 || 4.8 || 10
|-
| scope=row | 1972 ||  || 3
| 21 || 45 || 50 || 432 || 49 || 481 || 107 || 2.1 || 2.4 || 20.6 || 2.3 || 22.9 || 5.1 || 16
|- style=background:#EAEAEA
| scope=row | 1973 ||  || 3
| 19 || 51 || bgcolor=CAE1FF | 48† || 426 || 47 || 473 || 81 || 2.7 || 2.5 || 22.4 || 2.5 || 24.9 || 4.3 || 23
|-
| scope=row | 1974 ||  || 3
| 21 || 52 || 52 || 394 || 53 || 447 || 72 || 2.5 || 2.5 || 18.8 || 2.5 || 21.3 || 3.4 || 15
|- style=background:#EAEAEA
| scope=row | 1975 ||  || 3
| 23 || bgcolor=CAE1FF | 68† || 48 || 452 || 50 || 502 || 73 || 3.0|| 2.2 || 20.5 || 2.3 || 22.8 || 3.3 || 10
|-
| scope=row bgcolor=F0E68C | 1976# ||  || 3
| 22 || 71 || 42 || 416 || 79 || 495 || 67 || 3.2 || 1.9 || 18.9 || 3.6 || 22.5 || 3.0 || 23
|- style=background:#EAEAEA
| scope=row | 1977 ||  || 3
| 24 || 91 || bgcolor=CAE1FF | 57† || 514 || 144 || 658 || 133 || 3.8 || bgcolor=CAE1FF | 2.6† || 21.4 || 6.0 || 27.4 || 5.5 || 34
|-
| scope=row bgcolor=F0E68C | 1978# ||  || 3
| 23 || 71 || 58 || 463 || 123 || 586 || 147 || 3.1 || 2.5 || 20.1 || 5.3 || 25.5 || 6.4 || 3
|- style=background:#EAEAEA
| scope=row | 1979 ||  || 3
| 13 || 30 || 25 || 237 || 100 || 337 || 55 || 2.3 || 1.9 || 18.2 || 7.7 || 25.9 || 4.2 || 6
|-
| scope=row | 1980 ||  || 3
| 17 || 32 || 34 || 364 || 93 || 457 || 78 || 1.9 || 2.0 || bgcolor=CAE1FF | 21.4† || 5.5 || 26.9 || 4.6 || 16
|- style=background:#EAEAEA
| scope=row | 1981 ||  || 3
| 16 || 48 || 36 || 292 || 84 || 376 || 98 || 3.0 || 2.3 || 18.3 || 5.3 || 23.5 || 6.1 || 11
|-
| scope=row | 1982 ||  || 3
| 22 || 74 || 55 || 383 || 111 || 494 || 109 || 3.4 || 2.5 || 17.4 || 5.0 || 22.5 || 5.0 || 17
|- style=background:#EAEAEA
| scope=row bgcolor=F0E68C | 1983# ||  || 3
| 22 || 79 || 51 || 364 || 78 || 442 || 127 || 3.6 || 2.3 || 16.5 || 3.5 || 20.1 || 5.8 || 5
|-
| scope=row | 1984 ||  || 3
| 24 || 77 || 52 || 318 || 127 || 445 || 111 || 3.2 || 2.2 || 13.3 || 5.3 || 18.5 || 4.6 || 4
|- style=background:#EAEAEA
| scope=row | 1985 ||  || 3
| 21 || 56 || 36 || 210 || 72 || 282 || 77 || 2.7 || 1.7 || 10.0 || 3.4 || 13.4 || 3.7 || 4
|- class=sortbottom
! colspan=3 | Career
! 332 !! 915 !! 722 !! 6017 !! 1357 !! 7374 !! 1505 !! 2.8 !! 2.2 !! 18.2 !! 4.1 !! 22.3 !! 4.5 !! 202
|}

Coaching statistics

|- style=background:#EAEAEA
| scope=row | 1986 || 
| 19 || 12 || 7 || 0 || 63.2% || 6 || 12
|-
| scope=row | 1987 || 
| 22 || 7 || 15 || 0 || 31.8% || 12 || 14
|- style=background:#EAEAEA
| scope=row | 1988 || 
| 24 || 15 || 8 || 1 || 64.6% || 2 || 14
|-
| scope=row | 1989 || 
| 23 || 13 || 10 || 0 || 56.5% || 5 || 14
|- style=background:#EAEAEA
| scope=row bgcolor=F0E68C | 1990# || 
| 26 || 19 || 6 || 1 || 75.0% || 2 || 14
|-
| scope=row | 1991 || 
| 22 || 12 || 9 || 1 || 56.8% || 7 || 15
|- style=background:#EAEAEA
| scope=row | 1992 || 
| 23 || 16 || 7 || 0 || 69.6% || 3 || 15
|-
| scope=row | 1993 || 
| 20 || 11 || 9 || 0 || 55.0% || 8 || 15
|- style=background:#EAEAEA
| scope=row | 1994 || 
| 23 || 12 || 11 || 0 || 52.2% || 8 || 15
|-
| scope=row | 1995 || 
| 22 || 8 || 12 || 2 || 40.9% || 10 || 16
|- style=background:#EAEAEA
| scope=row | 1999 || 
| 25 || 18 || 7 || 0 || 72.0% || 3 || 16
|-
| scope=row | 2000 || 
| 24 || 13 || 11 || 0 || 54.2% || 6 || 16
|- style=background:#EAEAEA
| scope=row bgcolor=F0E68C | 2001# || 
| 25 || 20 || 5 || 0 || 80.0% || 2 || 16
|-
| scope=row bgcolor=F0E68C | 2002# || 
| 25 || 20 || 5 || 0 || 80.0% || 2 || 16
|- style=background:#EAEAEA
| scope=row bgcolor=F0E68C | 2003# || 
| 26 || 17 || 8 || 1 || 67.3% || 3 || 16
|-
| scope=row | 2004 || 
| 25 || 18 || 7 || 0 || 72.0% || 2 || 16
|- style=background:#EAEAEA
| scope=row | 2005 || 
| 21 || 10 || 11 || 0 || 47.6% || 11 || 16
|-
| scope=row | 2006 || 
| 22 || 7 || 15 || 0 || 31.8% || 13 || 16
|- style=background:#EAEAEA
| scope=row | 2007 || 
| 22 || 9 || 11 || 2 || 45.5% || 10 || 16
|-
| scope=row | 2008 || 
| 22 || 10 || 12 || 0 || 45.5% || 10 || 16
|- class=sortbottom
! colspan=2 | Career totals
! 461 !! 267 !! 186 !! 8 !! 58.8% !! colspan=2 |
|}

Honours and achievements

Playing honours
Team
 4× VFL premiership player: 1971, 1976 , 1978, 1983
 2× Minor premiership: 1971, 1975
 2× Night Series Winner: 1969, 1977

Individual
 VFLPA MVP Award (Later named the Leigh Matthews Trophy): 1982
 Coleman Medal: 1975
 All-Australian team: 1972
 Hawthorn Captain: 1981–1985
 8× Peter Crimmins Medal: 1971, 1972, 1974, 1976, 1977, 1978, 1980, 1982
 6× Hawthorn leading goalkicker: 1973, 1975, 1981, 1982, 1983, 1984
 Australian Football Media Association Player of the Year: 1982
 2× Victoria Australian rules football team: 1972, 1975
 Australian Football League Team of the Century
 Hawthorn Football Club Team of the Century

Coaching honours
Team
 AFL Premiership coach: 1990
 3× AFL Premiership coach: 2001, 2002, 2003

Individual
 4× Jock McHale Medal: 1990, 2001, 2002, 2003
 3× All-Australian team: 2001, 2002, 2003
 Brisbane Lions Team of the Decade (1997–2006)

Hall of Fame/Life membership 
 Australian Football Hall of Fame – Legend Status
 Hawthorn Football Club Hall of Fame – Legend Status
 Collingwood Hall of Fame (1990 premiership team)
 Brisbane Lions Hall of Fame
 Queensland Hall of Fame – Legend status
 Hawthorn life member
 Brisbane Lions life member

Post-career honours
Matthews was named "Player of the Century", inducted as an inaugural official Legend of the Australian Football Hall of Fame, the highest individual honour that can be bestowed upon a football personality. He was also named in both the AFL and Hawthorn Teams of the Century, in the forward pocket for the AFL and as rover for Hawthorn. In 2002, the AFLPA MVP award, of which Matthews was the inaugural recipient, was renamed the Leigh Matthews Trophy.

Matthews is one of only three Australian rules footballers recognised as a Legend of Australian Sport in the Sport Australia Hall of Fame, alongside Ron Barassi and Ted Whitten.

Outside football 

Before coaching the Brisbane Lions, Leigh Matthews made several media appearances as guest commentator. He has now returned to do special commentary of AFL matches on Seven Network. He commentated the 2008 Finals as well as the 2008 Grand Final. He is also a commentator of the game for 3AW and a feature writer and commentator for the Herald Sun.

References

Bibliography

External links

 

1952 births
All-Australians (1953–1988)
All-Australian coaches
Australian Football Hall of Fame inductees
Brisbane Lions coaches
Brisbane Lions Premiership coaches
Collingwood Football Club coaches
Collingwood Football Club Premiership coaches
Coleman Medal winners
Matthew, Leigh
Hawthorn Football Club Premiership players
Peter Crimmins Medal winners
Leigh Matthews Trophy winners
Living people
Australian rules footballers from Melbourne
Sport Australia Hall of Fame inductees
Chelsea Football Club (Australia) players
Australia international rules football team coaches
Radio personalities from Melbourne
3AW presenters
Four-time VFL/AFL Premiership players
Four-time VFL/AFL Premiership coaches
People from Frankston, Victoria
Color commentators